The Club de Tennis des Loisirs de Granby is a prominent tennis venue in Granby, Quebec, Canada.  It annually hosts the Granby Challenger tournament and has hosted a Davis Cup tie.

The club hosted July, 2006 Americas Group 1 first round play-offs Davis Cup tie against Venezuela, which Canada won 3-2.

External links
Official Website of the club (French)

Sports venues in Quebec
Sport in Granby, Quebec
Tennis venues in Quebec
Buildings and structures in Granby, Quebec
Tennis in Quebec